Kalle Samuelsson (born February 15, 1986) is a Swedish Bandy player who plays for Västerås SK as a goalkeeper.  Kalle was a youth product of Köpings IS.   

Kalle has played for three clubs:
 Köpings IS (2003–2004)
 Broberg/Söderhamn Bandy (2004–2005)
 Västerås SK (2005–present)

External links
  kalle samuelsson at bandysidan
  västerås sk

Swedish bandy players
Living people
1986 births
Broberg/Söderhamn Bandy players
Västerås SK Bandy players
Tillberga IK Bandy players